Herbert Charles Rodd (4 September 1894 – 15 June 1932) was a United States Naval Aviator. He served as the radio officer on the first successful transatlantic flight by the Curtiss NC-4 in May 1919 and later helped set additional world records for flight payload, duration and speed.

Rodd was born in Cleveland, Ohio on 4 September 1894. He joined the U.S. Navy on 9 April 1917 as an enlisted seaman but was granted a provisional ensign's commission on 20 August 1918.

After World War I, the U.S. Navy planned a transatlantic crossing by a division of four Curtiss NC seaplanes. Navy Ensign Rodd helped to develop the radio compass for these aircraft. Three seaplanes began the journey on 8 May 1919, but only the NC-4 completed the trip successfully. In the aftermath, he was made a knight of the Order of the Tower and Sword by the Portuguese government on 2 June 1919. As a member of the NC-4 crew, he was awarded the Navy Cross and later received a Congressional Gold Medal in 1929.

On 15–16 August 1927, Navy Lieutenants Rodd and Byron James Connell (12 August 1894 – 30 January 1972) flew a PN-10 seaplane for 20 hours, 45 minutes and 40 seconds on a 25-km triangular course until their fuel tanks ran dry. Their flight with Aviation Machinist's Mate Comar Vincent and a cargo of 500 kg of sand covered 2,525.3 km (about 1,568 miles). Lt. Connell had previously been the pilot on Cmdr. John Rodgers' 1925 attempt to fly from California to Hawaii in a PN-9 seaplane. The 1927 flight by Lts. Rodd and Connell set a new world record for average speed over a 2,000-km distance by a seaplane of 126.56 km/hr (78.56 miles/hr).

Lt. Cmdr. Rodd died in the crash of a Vought O2U Corsair seaplane near Hampton Roads, Virginia on 15 June 1932. He was buried in Arlington National Cemetery.

Legacy
The former Naval Auxiliary Air Station (NAAS) Rodd Field near Corpus Christi, Texas was named in honor of Lt. Cmdr. Rodd. This naval airfield operated from 7 June 1941 through the late 1950s. Rodd Field Road still exists in Corpus Christi.

References

External links

1894 births
1932 deaths
People from Cleveland
United States Navy officers
Recipients of the Navy Cross (United States)
Aviators from Ohio
United States Naval Aviators
American aviation record holders
Aviators killed in aviation accidents or incidents in the United States
Burials at Arlington National Cemetery
Victims of aviation accidents or incidents in 1932